PC3 may refer to:

PC3, a prostate cancer cell line
Paul Colman Trio, a Christian band
Prairie Capital Convention Center, a convention center in Springfield, IL, United States
The Clandestine Colombian Communist Party, an illegal Colombian political party
 DDR3 SDRAM
 Physical Containment Level 3, a research facility certification used in Australasia (third highest of four levels, PC1–PC4)